Streptomyces longisporoflavus is a bacterium species from the genus of Streptomyces which has been isolated from soil. Streptomyces longisporoflavus produces tetronasin and staurosporine.

Further reading

See also 
 List of Streptomyces species

References

External links
Type strain of Streptomyces longisporoflavus at BacDive -  the Bacterial Diversity Metadatabase	

longisporoflavus
Bacteria described in 1953